Bryndís Haraldsdóttir (born 1976) is an Icelandic politician who is a member of the Althing representing the Southwest constituency. She is also the 25th and incumbent president of the West Nordic Council, succeeding the former prime minister of Greenland, Lars-Emil Johansen in 2016.

References

External links 
 Biography of Bryndís Haraldsdóttir on the Althing website

1976 births
Living people
Bryndis Haraldsdottir
Bryndis Haraldsdottir
Bryndis Haraldsdottir